Clathromangelia fuscoligata is a species of sea snail, a marine gastropod mollusk in the family Raphitomidae.

Description
The shell is strongly sculptured, longitudinally and spirally. The color of the shell is brownish white, brown-banded at the suture, and in the middle of the body whorl. The nodulous intersections of the sculpture are frequently brown-tipped.

Distribution
This species occurs in the Pacific Ocean along California, USA

References

 Dall, W. H. 1871. Am J. Conchology. 7(2): 100

External links
  Bouchet P., Kantor Yu.I., Sysoev A. & Puillandre N. (2011) A new operational classification of the Conoidea. Journal of Molluscan Studies 77: 273–308 
 

fuscoligata